Postal codes in the Cayman Islands are used by the Cayman Islands Postal Service to route inbound mail to groups of post office boxes in the country.  A postal code typically consists of an island code, a hyphen separator, and a section code. They were introduced in 2006.

There are only three island codes: KY1 for Grand Cayman, KY2 for Cayman Brac, and KY3 for Little Cayman. Each of these is subdivided into section codes according to which local post office handles a particular group of boxes.

A single sheet portable document is available from CIPS listing all post codes in the archipelago.

External links

References

Communications in the Cayman Islands
Cayman Islands